The Australian Medical Association (AMA) is an Australian public company by guarantee formed as a professional association for Australian doctors and medical students. The association is not run by the Australian Government and does not regulate or certify doctors, a responsibility which lies with the  Medical Board of Australia and the Australian Health Practitioner Regulation Agency. The association's national headquarters are located in Barton, Australian Capital Territory, in addition to the offices of its branches in each of the states and territories in Australia.

Aims and objectives
The AMA has a range of representative and scientific committees. One of its stated aims is "leading the health policy debate by developing and promoting alternative policies to those government policies that the AMA considers poorly targeted or ill-informed; responding to issues in the health debate through the provision of a wide range of expert resources; and commissioning and conducting research on health issues.".

Organisation structure
The AMA uses a representative structure involving state branches and committees to work with members to promote and protect the interests of doctors in Australia.

The mechanisms that allow this include:
 working with governments to maintain and increase provision of world-class medical care to all Australians;
 tracking and reporting government performance on health;
 challenging government on policy that potentially harms the interests of patients;
 providing a resonant and authoritative expert medical commentary on health issues;
 responding to issues in the health debate through provision of a wide range of expert resources; and
 commissioning and conducting research on health issues.

The AMA supports patient care by serving the medical profession across a  broad range of services, including:
 protecting the academic, professional and economic independence and the well-being of medical practitioners;
 promoting and advancing ethical behaviour by the medical profession and protecting the integrity and independence of the doctor/patient relationship; and
 preserving and protecting the political, legal and industrial interests of medical practitioners.

Engagement, Equity and Inclusion
The AMA with slightly fewer than 30,000 members is the second largest association of Australian doctors, behind the RACGP, but slightly bigger than the RACP.

The AMA represents slightly fewer than 30% of all Australian doctors, down from previous levels of 95% in 1962 and 50% in 1987. The rate of membership amongst Australian GPs is lower than for other doctors, with approximately 6000 out of 45000 GPs being AMA members. Engagement of GPs by the AMA is lower than for the RACGP and ACRRM. In 2020, the incoming AMA President Omar Khorshid claimed in an interview that the AMA could still advocate on behalf of all doctors, even though only 30% of doctors supported the AMA through membership.

There are 15 officially recognised specialty medical Colleges in Australia. The AMA offers only the 11 largest out of the 15 representation on AMA Federal Council with the smaller Colleges currently ineligible for representation. The official Australian medical colleges that do not have representation within the AMA are Australasian College of Sport and Exercise Physicians, Australian College of Rural and Remote Medicine, College of Intensive Care Medicine and the Royal Australasian College of Medical Administrators.

The AMA offers an Indigenous Medical Scholarship. It has called upon the Federal government to spend more on Indigenous Health in a number of areas. However, the AMA lobbied against equitable time-tiered Medicare consultation rebates for different specialists, which was proposed by the MBS Review Taskforce. Inability to access equitable time-tiered MBS rebates for Sport & Exercise Medicine specialists under Medicare is an important issue for Indigenous Australians. In 2020, the AMA President Tony Bartone criticized attendees at the Black Lives Matter rallies in Australia during the COVID-19 pandemic for attending a large gathering, although AMA (WA) President Andrew Miller was supportive.

The AMA formed an Equity, Inclusion and Diversity Committee (EIDC) in 2016, which produced an anti-racism statement in 2018 . The AMA held a Gender Equity Summit in 2019 and set targets to improve female representation on AMA Boards and Committees, aiming for >=40%. The AMA has only had two female Presidents in its history. In early 2020, less than 20% of members on AMA Federal Council were female. After elections in mid-2020, this had increased to 27% of members on Federal council being female. In 2017, 42% of doctors were female in Australia.

History

The British Medical Association (BMA), founded in England in 1832 to promote both the study of medicine and protection of the medical profession, established branches in New South Wales, South Australia, Queensland and Victoria in 1879–80. The New South Wales branch, under its founding president Sir Arthur Renwick, replaced the earlier "Australian Medical Association" formed in Sydney by Dr William Bland in 1859. The BMA Branches of the Australian states and territories formally merged into the Australian Medical Association in 1962.

Presidents

 Cecil Colville (1962–1964)
 Sir Angus Murray (1964–1967)
 Clarence Rieger (1967–1970)
 Roderick Macdonald (1970–1972)
 Gavin Johnson (1972–1973)
 Sir Keith Jones (1973–1976)
 Rupert Magarey (1976–1979)
 Lionel Wilson (1979–1982)
 Lindsay Thompson (1982–1985)
 Trevor Pickering (1985–1988)
 Bryce Phillips (1998–1990)
 Bruce Shepherd (1990–1993)
 Brendan Nelson (1993–1995)
 David Weedon (1995–1996)
 Keith Woollard (1996–1998)
 David Brand (1998–2000)
 Kerryn Phelps (2000–2003)
 Bill Glasson (2003–2005)
 Mukesh Haikerwal (2005–2007)
 Rosanna Capolingua (2007–2009)
 Andrew Pesce (2009–2011)
 Steve Hambleton (2011–2014)
 Brian Owler (2014–2016)
 Michael Gannon (2016–2018)
 Tony Bartone (2018–2020)
 Omar Khorshid (2020–2022)
 Steve Robson (2022–present)

Other personnel
 Kerry Gallagher, secretary general (2007–2008)
 Francis J. Sullivan, secretary general (2008–2012)
 Ralph Howard, assistant general secretary (1964–1965)

Coat of arms

Positions
The AMA has traditionally been a conservative (rather than progressive) body, often opposing change rather than lobbying for change within medicine. For example, the AMA released a press release in early 2019 claiming an "Advocacy breakthrough" which in fact was to "oppose changes" being considered under a wide-ranging review of the Medicare Benefits Schedule. Historically the AMA has tended to oppose "government interference in the practice of medicine" advocating on behalf of the service-providers (doctors) rather than the consumers (patients). The AMA has been recently criticised for accepting the Australian Federal Government's JobSeeker subsidy during the COVID-19 pandemic in Australia despite being profitable during 2020.

Climate change

The AMA acknowledges the scientific consensus that climate change is real and anthropogenic. In September 2019, the AMA officially declared climate change a public health emergency, stating that "The scientific reality is that climate change affects health and wellbeing by increasing the situations in which infectious diseases can be transmitted, and through more extreme weather events, particularly heatwaves."

Tony Bartone, AMA President, noted that climate change will cause "higher mortality and morbidity from heat stress; injury and mortality from increasingly severe weather events; increases in the transmission of vector-borne diseases; food insecurity resulting from declines in agricultural outputs; a higher incidence of mental-ill health".

The AMA has agreed with Doctors for the Environment Australia (DEA) that the healthcare sector in Australia should aim for a 80% reduction in emissions by 2030, but the AMA is still supportive of medical procedures with a poor evidence-base that could be considered wasteful and a source of excess emissions.

The AMA has called on the Australian Government to:
 Adopt mitigation targets within an Australian carbon budget
 Promote the health benefits of addressing climate change
 Develop a National Strategy for Health and Climate Change
 Promote an active transition from fossil fuels to renewable energy
 Establish a National Sustainable Development Unit to reduce carbon emissions in the healthcare sector.

Community pill-testing
The AMA officially endorses trials to use pill-testing at community events such as festivals. AMA President Dr Tony Bartone publicly declared his support for pill-testing at festivals, stating that it would provide "an opportunity to try and inform [drug users] about the dangerous consequences and try to get an opportunity to give them education and access to rehabilitation in terms of trying to reduce their drug dependency." NSW Premier Gladys Berejiklian rejected the AMA's call for pill testing.

See also
 Australian Medical Students' Association
 Medical Journal of Australia
 AMA House, Sydney

References

Further reading

External links
 AMA – National site
 AMA – New South Wales Branch site
 AMA – Victoria Branch site
 AMA – South Australia Branch site
 AMA – Queensland Branch site
 AMA – Western Australia Branch site
 AMA – Tasmania Branch site

 
Organizations established in 1962
1962 establishments in Australia
Medical and health organisations based in Australia
Medical associations based in Australia